Incidents was a magazine that was closed by the Islamic Republic of Iran for being "obscene and empty" in June 1994. It reported homicides, pre-marital and extramarital affairs, and other sex-related matters that can be punished by religious law.

The Persian words Havades or Hadeseh reportedly mean Incidents.

References

Defunct magazines published in Iran
Legal magazines
Magazines with year of establishment missing
Magazines disestablished in 1994